"Everybody Needs Love" is a 1977 song recorded by American soul singer Marvin Gaye, co-composed with "Let's Get It On" co-writer Ed Townsend.
The song was issued on the singer's confessional 1978 album, Here, My Dear. Though most of the songs on the album were based on a mostly antagonistic view of Gaye's first wife, Anna Gaye, a few songs like this stood out which discussed how everybody needed love.

Background
The song was based on a religious theme and was switched around by Marvin in certain areas including the lyrics And my father/he needs love/that's true, baby/and I need love too hinting at the tempestuous relationship between Marvin and his minister-father Marvin, Sr. The song's musical background was also used to introduce the album on the title track.

Personnel
All vocals, piano and synthesizers by Marvin Gaye
Drums by Bugsy Wilcox
Bass by Frank Blair
Guitar by Gordon Banks
Trumpet by Nolan Smith

References

1978 songs
Marvin Gaye songs
Songs written by Marvin Gaye
Songs written by Ed Townsend
Song recordings produced by Marvin Gaye